Naai Kutty is a 2009 Indian Tamil-language drama film written and directed by Sathaji and produced by V. A. Durai. The film stars newcomer Selvin and Nicole, with Soori, Sippy, and Jayakumaran playing supporting roles. The film's music was composed by Vijayabharathi with cinematography by C. H. Prasath and editing by K. Thanikachalam. The film was released on 31 December 2009.

Plot
In a slum in Chennai, Naai Kutty (Selvin), an orphan, is brought up by a cycle rickshaw puller. He spends his time drinking alcohol in the company of his friend Maari (Soori), and he does not go for any work. Malli (Nicole) sells flowers in a temple near the slum, and she is in love with Naai Kutty, while her friend Ammu (Sippy) treats him like her brother. After the death of his adoptive father, Naai Kutty decides to ride his cycle rickshaw. Naai Kutty then comes in contact with prostitutes who uses his rickshaw and he gets paid handsomely for his service. Naai Kutty starts to carry prostitutes and he eventually buys an auto rickshaw. One day, rowdies try to misbehave with the prostitutes in a brothel, Naai Kutty beats the rowdies up and saves the prostitutes. Impressed by his strength, the kingpin of the flesh trade Reddy (Jayakumaran) hires Naai Kutty as his henchman.

One day, Ammu is sold by her father to Reddy, Naai Kutty clashes with Reddy to save her and he quits his job in disgust. Later, Naai Kutty sells his auto rickshaw and buys a van to start a new life. In the meantime, Maari, who runs in the councillor election, begs Naai Kutty to lend him money for the election, but Naai Kutty refuses because he has run out of money. A vengeful Reddy hatches a conspiracy against Naai Kutty, and he convinces Maari to leave Malli to him. Malli is drugged, and wealthy clients rape an unconscious Malli in the brothel. Naai Kutty then meets Reddy, and Reddy gives him money to dispose of a body. At the cemetery, a drunk Naai Kutty discovers the body of Malli, and he is in shock. The slum dwellers who come across Naai Kutty misunderstand the situation and beat Naai Kutty to death. The film ends with Ammu killing Maari for betraying Naai Kutty.

Cast

Selvin as Naai Kutty
Nicole as Malli
Soori as Maari
Sippy as Ammu
Jayakumaran as Reddy
Editor Manivannan
Auto Krishnamoorthy
S. Vijayaraj
T. Sivakumar
Abdul Kader
R. Keerthi
Prathap
Kalamalai Velmurugan
Mano
Santhosh
Jakir
Thambiran
Bhagya Sri
Easwari
Shobana
Umaraani
Vani Sri as Prostitute
Priya as Transgender
Priyanga as Transgender
Sashasri in a special appearance
Sandy in a special appearance

Production
The film was announced by V. A. Durai, producer of Pithamagan (2003) and Gajendra (2004), in mid-2008, where it was reported that S. S. Joe, an associate of Ram, would work on a film revolving a youth brought up in a Chennai slum. S. S. Joe was himself raised in the slums of Chennai and so he was expected to bring out the emotional and social plight of slum dwellers with reality as the strength. Prasanna and Nicole signed to play the lead roles while comedian Santhanam was approached to play a significant role and Sundar C. Babu was chosen to compose the music.

The film was inaugurated in Chennai on 24 September 2008 without the presence of S. S. Joe. In late-September 2008, a complaint had been lodged by director Ram Shiva in the councils of Tamilnadu film producers and directors. Director Ram Siva, regarding his complaint said, "The story of Naai Kutty has been stolen from the Kannada film Nanda Loves Nanditha which was a smash hit in Karnataka. I hold the copyright to remake the movie in Tamil. As the efforts of Durai and Sathaji to buy the right for the remake ended in vain, they have ventured into remaking the same movie in Tamil with a different name Naai Kutty". Director S. S. Joe had withdrawn from the project and had left Chennai, to avoid facing the legal problems which would possibly come in the future.

Subsequently, V. A. Durai restarted the project with a new script and Sathaji was chosen to direct the film whereas Kannada music director Vijayabharathi signed to compose the music. Newcomer Selvin signed on after Prasanna opted out of the role and Soori replaced Santhanam.

Soundtrack

The film score and the soundtrack were composed by Vijayabharathi. The soundtrack features 6 tracks, and it was released on 25 July 2009 by actor Silambarasan. A reviewer rated the album 2.5 out of 5 and said, "This album doesn't shout from the rooftops, of course. But it is pleasant, neat and functional, probably falling well in line with the storyline".

Release
The film got an A certificate with a few cuts for its violence and bloodshed and it was released on 31 December 2009.

Critical reception
Sify wrote, "There is nothing positive in the film. It tries to cash in on the slum life and its brutal ways but ends up as too pretentious" and called the film "a waste of time". Behindwoods rated the film 0.5 out of 5 stars and stated, "Naai Kutty is a sorry tale of a man for whom nothing went right in life. It does not bring any cheer to the audience, neither is it able to make the viewer pity nor feel for the suffering characters". Indiaglitz said, "Though Naaikutty had all potential to become a sleeping hit, it has ended up a dull affair, blame predictable sequences narrated in a vague way".

Box office
The film took a below average opening at the Chennai box office.

References

2009 films
2000s Tamil-language films
Indian drama films
Films shot in Chennai
Films set in Chennai
Films about prostitution in India
2009 directorial debut films
Films involved in plagiarism controversies
2009 drama films